Frühling may refer to

German for Spring

People 

Tim Frühling (born 1975), German disc jockey and Radio personality
Carl Frühling (1868 – 1937), Austrian composer and pianist

Culture 

Im Frühling (Op. 101, no. 1, D. 882) by Franz Schubert
Frühlings Erwachen, see Spring Awakening (play)
Der Frühling braucht Zeit, 1966 East German drama film directed by Günter Stahnke 
Frühlingsstimmen (Op. 410) by Johann Strauss II
Frühlingsrauschen (Op. 32, No. 3) by Christian Sinding
Frühlingssonate; see Violin Sonata No. 5 (Beethoven)

Surnames from nicknames